The Morrisby Profile is a matched series of timed cognitive aptitude tests.  The current version is screen-based and was first published in 2014.  In this version, five different aptitudes are assessed: verbal, numerical, abstract, spatial and mechanical.  The assessments each present a series of items and the candidate selects their answer from the options provided. The first three tests have two parts each. Each section is preceded by some untimed practice items. The results are normed against a standardisation sample.   Norms are available to a lower limit of 14 years of age.  See Norm-referenced test.  The results are presented as a bar chart, forming a profile of the individual’s results on the five measures.

Questionnaires 
The five aptitude assessments are presented alongside an untimed careers interest questionnaire. This is a Likert scale based questionnaire of up to 103 questions. The results are ipsative and indicate relative strength of interest in 10 career interest categories, 5 workstyle and 4 workplace dimensions. An optional, untimed Personality Test is also available.  This follows a similar structure to the Myers Briggs Type Indicator but breaks with Personality type theory in that it permits indistinct results on each of the four bi-polar scales giving 81 potential categorisations.  

The total administration time for the five aptitude assessments and both questionnaires is typically a little under 1 hour 40 minutes.

Context 
The Morrisby Profile is only available within the Morrisby Careers platform. The results are used to generate career, subject and study suggestions. The system links to the Gatsby career benchmarks and the SkillsBuilder essential skills framework.  It carries the Career Development Institute’s Career Assured award and the matrix accreditation.

History 
The Morrisby Profile is derived from the Differential Test Battery developed by John Morrisby in the UK and first published in 1955. This was heavily revised, although following a similar format to its precursor,  and renamed Morrisby Profile in 1991. A further revision occurred in 2005 which was finally discontinued in 2020.  All these versions were paper and pencil based and comprised six aptitude tests coupled with 4 personality metrics and a pair of optional dexterity tests.  The current online version has been available since 2014.

References

Personality tests